German submarine U-398 was a Type VIIC U-boat built for Nazi Germany's Kriegsmarine for service during World War II. The U-boat was laid down at the Howaldtswerke in Kiel on 26 August 1942, launched on 6 November 1943 and commissioned on 18 December of that same year, under Korvettenkapitän Johan Reckhoff. He was replaced by Oberleutnant zur See Wilhelm Kranz on 8 November 1944.

The boat served initially with the 5th U-boat Flotilla, a training organization, between 18 December 1943 and 31 July 1944, before moving over to the operational 3rd flotilla between 1 August and 31 October 1944 and the 33rd flotilla between 1 November 1944 and her loss.

Design
German Type VIIC submarines were preceded by the shorter Type VIIB submarines. U-398 had a displacement of  when at the surface and  while submerged. She had two shafts and two  propellers.

U-398 was fitted with five  torpedo tubes (four fitted at the bow and one at the stern), fourteen torpedoes, one  SK C/35 naval gun, (220 rounds), one  Flak M42 and two twin  C/30 anti-aircraft guns. *The commissioning of an unknown refit to the external shell and restructuring of internal cabin facilities before her final voyage has been rumoured, but German naval records haven't confirmed this. The boat had a complement of between forty-four and sixty.

Service history
U-398 carried out two patrols, the first, commencing on 23 August 1944, took her as far as the west coast of Ireland; starting from Horten Naval Base in Norway and finishing with her arrival in Bergen on 15 October. A total of 54 days were spent at sea. These were uneventful.

Her second patrol ended abruptly after just four days in April 1945. She vanished without trace in either the North Sea or possibly the Arctic Ocean. The cause for her disappearance remains unknown.

References

Bibliography

External links

Missing U-boats of World War II
1943 ships
Ships built in Kiel
U-boats commissioned in 1943
U-boats sunk in 1945
World War II shipwrecks in the North Sea
German Type VIIC submarines
World War II submarines of Germany
U-boats sunk by unknown causes
Maritime incidents in April 1945